"Baba Yetu" (Swahili: "Our Father") is the theme song for the 2005 video game Civilization IV. It was composed by Christopher Tin and performed by Ron Ragin and the Stanford Talisman. For its re-release in Tin's debut album Calling All Dawns, it was performed by the Soweto Gospel Choir. The song, when rereleased, became the first piece of video game music to be nominated for and to win a Grammy Award.

Composition
Tin is a fan of the Civilization series. During his five-year college reunion at Stanford University, he reconnected with his former roommate Soren Johnson; both had been part of an overseas program during their studies at Oxford University, with Johnson studying history and Tin studying music. Johnson told Tin at the reunion he had been working on Civilization III, and Tin expressed his love of the series to him. Some months after the reunion, Johnson contacted Tin and told him they were looking for music for the introduction for their new game Civilization IV, and wanted him to help. Johnson said they were inspired by the performances of the Stanford Talisman, an a capella group at Stanford that specialize in traditional African music, and wanted Tin to compose something similar for the theme. Tin took about a month to compose the track before recording it with Talisman for the game's track.

Lyrics
The lyrics of "Baba Yetu" (which means "Our Father" in Swahili) are a translation of the Lord's Prayer.

In 2007, "Baba Yetu" was released by Alfred Music Publishing, and it was rearranged by Tin for an SATB a cappella choir with optional percussion accompaniment in 2011. Other arrangements include SSATBB choir, TTBB choir, string orchestra, concert band, piano quintet, and piano/voice.

Reviews
"Baba Yetu" garnered much critical praise, with over 20 reviewers singling out the theme on platforms such as IGN and GameSpy.

Awards and achievements
"Baba Yetu" was nominated for the 53rd Annual Grammy Awards in the Grammy Award for Best Arrangement, Instrumental and Vocals category, and on February 13, 2011, it was announced as the winner of its category, making it the first piece of music composed for a video game to be nominated for and win a Grammy Award. At the 10th annual Independent Music Awards, "Baba Yetu" was the winner in the 'Song Used in Film/TV/Multimedia' and 'World Beat Song' categories.

Notable performances
"Baba Yetu" is a frequent piece performed during Video Games Live concerts. It has been performed at various venues and events around the world, including Carnegie Hall, the Lincoln Center, Disney Concert Hall, The Dubai Fountain, the Kennedy Center, Royal Festival Hall, the Hollywood Bowl, the New Year's Concert of the sixty-seventh session of the United Nations General Assembly, as well as the 2017 Llangollen International Musical Eisteddfod. Notable ensembles that have performed the song include the Royal Philharmonic Orchestra, Welsh National Opera, National Symphony Orchestra, US Navy Band, and various YouTube artists, including Peter Hollens, Alex Boye, BYU Men's Choir and Korean Acapella group Maytree which was praised by Tin himself.

"Baba Yetu" is a popular contemporary choral piece, and has been sung in many competitions.  Notably, the Angel City Chorale performed it during the 13th season of America's Got Talent, earning guest judge Olivia Munn's golden buzzer, advancing the choir to the live shows. On the final night of that same season on the show, the acrobatic dance group Zurcaroh performed a routine to the song. In addition, the Stellenbosch University Choir won the Open, Youth, and Mixed choir categories for their performance of it at the 2018 Llangollen International Musical Eisteddfod.

On the 6th of August 2019, "Baba Yetu" was played at the signing of the Maputo Accord, which brought an end to the RENAMO insurgency in Mozambique.

References

Video game theme songs
2005 songs
Lord's Prayer
Grammy Award for Best Instrumental Arrangement Accompanying Vocalist(s)
Civilization (series)
Swahili-language songs